Corduliidae, also knowns as the emeralds, emerald dragonflies, or green-eyed skimmers, is a family of dragonflies. These dragonflies are usually black or dark brown with areas of metallic green or yellow, and most of them have large, emerald-green eyes. The larvae are black, hairy-looking, and usually semiaquatic. This family include species called "baskettails", "emeralds", "sundragons", "shadowdragons", and "boghaunters". They are not uncommon and are found nearly worldwide, but some individual species are quite rare. Hine's emerald dragonfly (Somatochlora hineana), for example, is an endangered species in the United States.

Selected genera
Some genera included in this family are:
 Aeschnosoma 
 Antipodochlora  – dusk dragonfly
 Cordulia  – American emeralds
 Corduliochlora 
 Cordulisantosia 
 Dorocordulia  – little emeralds
 Epitheca  – baskettails
 Guadalca 
 Helocordulia  – sundragons
 Hemicordulia  - emeralds
 Heteronaias 
 Libellulosoma 
 Metaphya  – emeralds
 Navicordulia 
 Neurocordulia  – shadowdragons
 Paracordulia 
 Pentathemis  – metallic tigerhawk
 Procordulia  – emeralds
 Schizocordulia 
 Somatochlora  – striped emeralds
 Williamsonia  – boghaunters

References

External links

 Several Emerald Photos
 Hine's Emerald Dragonfly Fan Page

 
Libelluloidea
Odonata families
Odonata of Australia